NGC 357 is a barred lenticular or spiral galaxy in the constellation Cetus. It was discovered on September 10, 1785 by William Herschel. It was described by Dreyer as "faint, small, irregularly round, suddenly brighter middle, 14th magnitude star 20 arcsec to northeast."

See also 
 List of NGC objects (1–1000)

References

External links 
 
 
 SEDS

0357
3768
17850910
Cetus (constellation)
Discoveries by William Herschel
Barred lenticular galaxies